Lon Ray Cardon  is an American human geneticist who is President and Chief Executive Officer of The Jackson Laboratory. Previous to joining The Jackson Laboratory in 2021, he had roles as Chief Scientific Officer and Chief Scientific Strategy Officer at BioMarin Pharmaceutical and senior vice president at GlaxoSmithKline, where he worked to translate the results of genetic research regarding the causes of human diseases into improved medical treatments. Prior to his work in the pharmaceutical industry, he conducted academic research on the genetic basis of human diseases, serving as full professor at the University of Oxford in the United Kingdom from 1998 to 2006, and at the University of Washington and Fred Hutchinson Cancer Research Center in the United States from 2006 to 2008. 

Cardon conducted his PhD research at the Institute for Behavior Genetics at the University of Colorado Boulder and received his postdoctoral training in the department of mathematics at Stanford University. He was elected to the Academy of Medical Sciences in 2005. He is also a fellow of the American Association for the Advancement of Science and a former Wellcome Trust Principal Research Fellow.

His research groups helped to create the present global genomics research infrastructure, including co-founding the Wellcome Trust Case Control Consortium and yielding the first Genome-Wide Association Studies.

References

External links
Biography at the National Institutes of Health's All of Us Research Program

American geneticists
Living people
Statistical geneticists
Fellows of the Academy of Medical Sciences (United Kingdom)
Fellows of the American Association for the Advancement of Science
Wellcome Trust Principal Research Fellows
University of Puget Sound alumni
University of Colorado Boulder alumni
GSK plc people
Academics of the University of Oxford
University of Washington faculty
Year of birth missing (living people)
Fred Hutchinson Cancer Research Center people